Lasius pogonogynus is a species of ant belonging to the genus Lasius, formerly part of the genus (now a subgenus) Acanthomyops. Described in 1950 by Buren, the species is native to the United States.

References

External links

pogonogynus
Hymenoptera of North America
Insects of the United States
Insects described in 1950